Mongaup Valley is a hamlet (and census-designated place) in Sullivan County, New York, United States. Mongaup Valley has a post office with ZIP code 12762, which opened on June 22, 1848.

Notable person
Stephanie Blythe (born 1970), mezzo-soprano

References

Hamlets in Sullivan County, New York
Hamlets in New York (state)